Simon Jonathon Graham Doggart (8 February 1961 – 23 July 2017) was an English first-class cricketer and headmaster.

Born in Winchester, Hampshire, Doggart was educated at Winchester and Magdalene College, Cambridge. He represented Cambridge University as a left-handed batsman in 35 first-class matches between 1980 and 1983. He was awarded four blues. His grandfather Graham Doggart, great-uncle James Hamilton Doggart, father Hubert Doggart and uncle Peter Doggart all played first-class cricket.

He was a former headmaster of Caldicott School in Farnham Royal, Buckinghamshire. Doggart announced in February 2017 that he intended, at the age of 56, to resign from his position as Head of Caldicott School with effect from July 2017. 

In February 2017 it was revealed that a former mentor of his, John Smyth, had engaged in sadistic physical abuse by violently beating young men. In April 2017 it was alleged that Doggart had, after being the victim of Smyth's abusive beatings as a young man, also administered severe beatings alongside Smyth. In May 2017 the school announced that "due to ill health Simon is no longer able to lead the school", and an acting Head, Theroshene Naidoo, took over with immediate effect.  As his health deteriorated, he died on 23 July 2017 in East Wittering, Chichester, with his family by his side.

References

External links
 Cricinfo
 Cricket Archive
 Caldicott School

1961 births
2017 deaths
Cambridge University cricketers
English cricketers
People educated at Winchester College
Alumni of Magdalene College, Cambridge
Heads of schools in England
British Universities cricketers
Cricketers from Winchester